Middlemarch is a 1994 television adaptation of the 1871 novel of the same name by George Eliot. Produced by the BBC on BBC2 in six episodes (seven episodes in the worldwide TV series), it is the second such adaptation for television of the novel.  It was directed by Anthony Page from a screenplay by Andrew Davies, and starred Juliet Aubrey, Rufus Sewell, Douglas Hodge and Patrick Malahide.

Plot
Dorothea Brooke (Juliet Aubrey) attempts to satisfy her underdeveloped intellect through marriage to the Reverend Edward Casaubon (Patrick Malahide), a man twice her age. The marriage proves unsatisfying and ends with Casaubon's unexpected death. Dorothea eventually meets Will Ladislaw (Rufus Sewell), an event which leads to further complications.

For a full-length summary of the novel see: Middlemarch plot summary.

Cast
Juliet Aubrey as Dorothea Brooke
Patrick Malahide as Rev. Edward Casaubon
Rufus Sewell as Will Ladislaw
Douglas Hodge as Dr Tertius Lydgate
Robert Hardy as Arthur Brooke
Caroline Harker as Celia Brooke
Julian Wadham as Sir James Chettam
Elizabeth Spriggs as Mrs Cadwallader
Jonathan Firth as Fred Vincy
Trevyn McDowell as Rosamund Vincy
Michael Hordern as Peter Featherstone
Rachel Power as Mary Garth
Peter Jeffrey as Bulstrode
Judi Dench as George Eliot (voiceover)
Roger Milner as Pratt

Awards
British Academy Television Awards - Best Actress (Juliet Aubrey), Best Make Up, Best Original Television Music
Broadcasting Press Guild Awards - Best Actress (Juliet Aubrey)
Writers' Guild of Great Britain - Best Dramatised Serial
Television and Radio Industries Club Awards - BBC Programme of the Year

Reactions
In a 28 March 1994 review for The New York Times, Elizabeth Kolbert said the mini-series was a hit in Britain as it "mesmerized millions of viewers here, setting off a mini-craze for Victorian fiction. In its wake there were Middlemarch lectures, Middlemarch comics, even a wave of Middlemarch debates. Authors and columnists argued in the London papers over whether Dorothea would, in fact, live happily ever after, whether Casaubon, if left alone, would have finished his great work and finally whether Will Ladislaw entered his marriage bed a virgin." In an 11 April 1994 review in Time magazine, John Elson also noted this fact, further stating that the series, "was a recent critical and popular success in Britain, leading to lectures and even debates on the novel. As a result of the show, a Penguin paperback of the novel topped best-seller lists for five weeks, and is still doing well. The town of Stamford, Lincolnshire, where exteriors were filmed, is preparing for a summertime influx of tourists."

References

External links
AMG listing - New York Times movie section
 
 

1994 British television series debuts
1994 British television series endings
1990s British drama television series
BBC television dramas
Television shows based on British novels
1990s British television miniseries
English-language television shows
Television shows set in Lincolnshire
Television shows set in Somerset
Films directed by Anthony Page
Television shows written by Andrew Davies
Television series set in the 1830s